The World Mixed Doubles Curling Championships are annual curling tournaments featuring the world's best teams of mixed doubles curlers.

History
The tournament began in 2008 with the 2008 World Mixed Doubles Curling Championship. Switzerland's mixed doubles team of Irene Schori and Toni Müller dominated the 2008 and 2009 championships and appeared in the first three worlds. At the 2010 Worlds, Russia won its first ever world curling title by defeating New Zealand, also first-time curling medalists. Russia did not successfully defend its world title, however, as they were defeated in the final of the 2011 Worlds by Switzerland, who won its third championship in four years. Switzerland then defended its title the next year, earning its fourth gold medal with a win over Sweden. In 2013, Hungary won their first world curling title after defeating Sweden in the final.

The 2020 event was cancelled on March 14, 2020 due to the COVID-19 pandemic.

Qualification
From its creation in 2008 until 2020 the championship was open entry, meaning any World Curling Federation (WCF) member could send a team. With the popularity of curling, and specifically mixed doubles, growing this policy of open entry led to 48 teams participating in the 2019 championship, the final year of open entry. 

Beginning in 2020 the championship will be limited to 20 teams, the top sixteen countries from the previous championship and four countries from a newly created qualification event. Called the World Mixed Doubles Qualification Event, the inaugural tournament will be held in December 2019 in Howwood, Scotland. This qualification tournament is open to any WCF member not already qualified for the championship.

Results

Medal table
As of 2022 World Championships

Performance timeline

See also
List of World Men's Curling Champions
List of World Women's Curling Champions
List of Olympic medalists in curling
List of Paralympic medalists in wheelchair curling

References

External links
WCF Results

World Mixed Doubles Curling Championship
Mixed Doubles